Jacob Smith Park is a park owned by Harrogate Borough Council in the outskirts of Knaresborough, North Yorkshire, England.

It is located in Scriven, and was opened in 2008.

Notes

Parks and open spaces in North Yorkshire